Marran may refer to:
 Mårran, a band
 Marran, Iran (disambiguation), places in Iran
 Maran, Syria (also spelled Marran), a village in Aleppo Governorate, Syria